Kangding Airport  is an airport serving Kangding, the capital of Garzê Tibetan Autonomous Prefecture in western Sichuan Province, China. Construction of the airport began in September 2006 and the airport started operation on April 26, 2009.

Airlines and destinations

Incidents
Two China Eastern pilots had their licences revoked and an assistant captain was suspended from flying after a failed landing at Kangding Airport on 1 May 2016. They were attempting to land an Airbus 319 on a scheduled flight MU5443 from Chengdu to Kangding. An attempt was made to land during bad weather; the aircraft hit the ground outside the runway at great speed, almost causing a serious crash. The aircraft suffered damage to its landing gear and tail, and returned to Chengdu after missing the approach. The co-pilot was seated in the cabin, with the assistant captain in the cockpit, however two experienced captains are required to be at the controls when landing at this high altitude airport.

See also
List of airports in China
List of the busiest airports in China

References

Airports in Sichuan
Airports established in 2009
2009 establishments in China
Buildings and structures in the Garzê Tibetan Autonomous Prefecture